Drew Christian Ruggles (born July 28, 1992) is an American soccer player who currently plays for Florida Tropics SC in the Major Arena Soccer League and the United Premier Soccer League.

Career

College and amateur
Ruggles played three years of college soccer at Georgia Southern University between 2010 and 2013. While at college, Ruggles also appeared for USL PDL club Michigan Bucks during their 2013 season.

Ruggles also appeared for the Georgia Southern Eagles football team in 2012.

Professional
Ruggles signed his first professional contract with USL Pro club Wilmington Hammerheads on April 4, 2014.

Ruggles was released by Wilmington at the end of the 2014, later signing with USL club Rochester Rhinos on March 26, 2015.

After winning the 2018–19 Major Arena Soccer League championship with the Milwaukee Wave, Ruggles joined Florida Tropics SC on 21 May 2019.

References

1992 births
Living people
American soccer players
Georgia Southern Eagles men's soccer players
Flint City Bucks players
Wilmington Hammerheads FC players
Rochester New York FC players
Association football defenders
USL League Two players
USL Championship players
Soccer players from North Carolina
Major Arena Soccer League players
National Premier Soccer League players
Milwaukee Wave players
Florida Tropics SC players
American football placekickers
Georgia Southern Eagles football players
United Premier Soccer League players